Gortnaran is a townland of 268 acres in County Londonderry, Northern Ireland. It is situated in the civil parish of Cumber Upper and the historic barony of Tirkeeran.

See also 
List of townlands in County Londonderry

References 

Townlands of County Londonderry
Civil parish of Cumber Upper